The Formula Regional Asian Championship is an FIA-certified regional Formula 3 racing series, which started in 2018. On 26 January 2018 it was confirmed that pan-Asian promoter Top Speed would organise the championship. Despite using Formula Regional cars since its establishment, the series was called F3 Asian Championship for four years until it was eventually rebranded in December 2021, when the FIA brought an end to F3 as a category.

The inaugural 2018 championship season featured 15 races held during five rounds of 3-race weekends on  circuits across Asia. The driver champion receives FIA Super Licence points, while also it features the AM (amateur) and teams standings.

Car
The championship features Tatuus designed and built cars. The cars will be constructed out of carbon fibre and feature a monocoque chassis which feature a number of enhanced safety features including the new Halo device and improved side impact protection, and will have a six-speed paddle shift gear box. The car will be powered by a single-make 270 hp turbo engine provided by Autotecnica.

Champions

Drivers'

Teams'

Masters Cup

Rookie Cup

Winter series champions

Drivers'

Teams'

Masters Cup

Circuits

Footnotes

References

External links
 

 
Asian auto racing series
2018 establishments in Asia
Recurring sporting events established in 2018
Formula Regional